Al-Bab ( / ALA-LC: al-Bāb) is a city, de jure administratively belonging to the Aleppo Governorate of the Syrian Arab Republic. As of December 2016, the city is under the control of pro-Turkish militias, as part of the Turkish occupation of northern Syria. According to the Central Bureau of Statistics (CBS), it had a population of 63,069 in 2004. The population has surged to about 100,000 during the Syrian Civil War. Prior to the Syrian Civil War, al-Bab's inhabitants were composed of a Sunni Arab majority, and a Kurdish minority outside the city center.

Name
Al-Bāb in Arabic means the door. According to Arab geographer Yaqut al-Hamawi in 1226, the name is a shortening of Bāb Bizāʻah (the gate to Bizāʻah).

History
During the Roman Empire, Al-Bab was a civitas of the Roman Province of Syria, known as Batnai.

Al-Bab was conquered by the Arab army of the Rashidun Caliphate under caliph Umar ibn al-Khattab in the 7th century. It received its name, meaning "the Gate", during Islamic rule as it served as "the gate" between Aleppo and the adjacent town of Buza'ah. The tomb and shrine of Aqil ibn Abi Talib (the brother of Ali) was located in al-Bāb.

Until its rule by the Ayyubids in the 13th century, the town was populated mostly by Shias of the Ismaili sect.

According to Yaqut al-Hamawi in 1226, it was a small town in the district of Aleppo. In the town were markets filled with cotton products called kirbas which were exported to Damascus and Egypt. The fourteenth-century historian Abu'l-Fida writes that al-Bab was a small town with a market, a bath, pleasant gardens, and a mosque (the Great Mosque of al-Bab).

The fortunes of Al-Bab were shared with that of Aleppo when that city was conquered by the Ottoman Turks in 1516, and was administered as part of the Eyalet of Aleppo until 1866 and the Vilayet of Aleppo until January 1919, when the district was occupied by French troops and attached to the State of Aleppo within the French mandate of Syria.

Syrian Civil War

Until April 2012, Al-Bab had been relatively unscathed by the Syrian civil war. Between mid-May and mid-July, some 15 rebel groups formed within the city. The fight for Al-Bab included a series of raids and assaults on government offices over the course of two months, finally culminating on 18 July when rebels seized the final government stronghold within the city limits. According to opposition activists, an army garrison remained outside al-Bab and shelled the insurgents' positions. Rebel forces pushed the army from this garrison on the south edge of town on 29 July, With the seizure of al-Bab, the insurgents in northern Aleppo gained considerable momentum. The city's capture gave the militants full control of the areas northeast of Aleppo. However, in the summer of 2013 Islamic State of Iraq and the Levant had a presence in the town and by mid November, 2013, was in full control of Al-Bab.

After the capture of Manbij by the Syrian Democratic Forces in August 2016, al-Bab was reported to be the next objective of the Syrian Democratic Forces (SDF) campaign. In December 2016, al-Bab came under an attack by Syrian rebels backed by Turkey. Turkish air strikes on 21 December destroyed 67 Islamic State targets; 59 Turkish soldiers and over 200 rebels were reported killed. Al-Bab was a strategically important town for Turkey because it did not want the two SDF regions to link up. On 9 February 2017, a Russian air strike killed three Turkish soldiers by mistake. On 23 February 2017, al-Bab was captured by Turkish-backed rebels, becoming a part of the Turkish buffer zone.

On 15 July 2020, unknown aircraft, suspected to be Russian, carried out airstrikes on the city of al-Bab. An apartment complex was destroyed in the attack. One civilian was killed and at least 10 others were injured in the airstrikes. It was the first airstrike on the town since it was captured from ISIL.

Security 
In February 2017, a Turkish trained police force of 2000 men was deployed in al-Bab.

Education  
in 2019 it was announced that the University of Gaziantep is opening a Faculty of Economics and administrative Sciences in al-Bab.

Climate
Al-Bab has a cold semi-arid climate (Köppen climate classification BSk) with influences of a continental climate during winter with hot dry summers and cool wet and occasionally snowy winters.
The snow usually falls in December or January.

References

Populated places in al-Bab District